Per Jonas Wiberg (born 8 June 1968) is the former keyboardist of Swedish progressive death metal band Opeth, and a member of Michael Amott's stoner metal band Spiritual Beggars.

Wiberg was born in Borlänge. He toured with Opeth from the 2003 Deliverance/Damnation tour onward, and joined Opeth officially in 2005. Wiberg provided backing vocals for Opeth in addition to his keyboard duties. Before joining Spiritual Beggars, Wiberg was a member of Death Organ, a band based in Borlänge. He has also fronted the band Boom Club, of the same area.

Wiberg played the keyboard in the intro to "Enemy Within" by the melodic death metal band Arch Enemy. He has also played piano on Swedish progressive rock band Anekdoten's 1993 release Vemod. In 2007, he collaborated on a project called King Hobo with Clutch drummer Jean-Paul Gaster and Kamchatka guitarist Thomas Andersson.

It was announced on 6 April 2011 that Wiberg was leaving Opeth as part of a mutual decision between him and the other band members. Since 2012 he has been a live musician for the Swedish doom metal band Candlemass as well as joining Swedish band Switchblade on selected dates as a keyboard player. In 2013 he joined Swedish trio Kamchatka as a bass player and full-time member. He plays on the Kamchatka albums The Search Goes On and Long Road Made of Gold.

Equipment
Per Wiberg uses Nord & Mellotron keyboards, EBS & Blackstar amps, and Fender & Gibson guitars and basses.

Discography

Per Wiberg
Head Without Eyes (2019)
All Is Well In The Land Of The Living (2021)

With Opeth
Lamentations DVD (2003)
Ghost Reveries (2005)
The Roundhouse Tapes (2007)
Watershed (2008)
In Live Concert at the Royal Albert Hall (2010)
Blackwater Park - Legacy Edition (2010)
The Throat of Winter 7-inch (2011)
Heritage (2011)
The Devil's Orchard - Live at Rock Hard Festival 2009 (2011)

With Spiritual Beggars
Mantra III (1998)
Violet Karma 10-inch (1998)
Ad Astra (2000)
It's Over split 7-inch with Grand Magus (2001)
On Fire (2002)
Demons (2005)
Live Fire DVD (2005)
Return to Zero (2010)
Return to Live: Loud Park 2010 (2011)
Earth Blues (2013)
Spiritual Beggars - Reissue (2013)
Sunrise to Sundown (2016)
Thumbsucker/Stoned Woman 7-inch (2016)
European Rock Invasion Vol 1: Svenskt Anfall split 12-inch with Siena Root & Truckfighters (2021)

With Kamchatka
The Search Goes On (2014)
Doorknocker Blues 7-inch (2014)
Ain't Fallin''' (digital single) (2014)Long Road Made of Gold (2015)Devil Dance (digital single) (2016)No One That Can Tell (digital single) (2016)Stone Cold Shaky Bones/Midnight Charmer 7-inch (2018)Hoodoo Lightning  (2019)

With Switchblade
 Switchblade - "2012" (album) (2012)
 Switchblade - "2016" (album) (2016)

With MojoboneTales From the Bone (1999)Crossroad Message (2002)Cowboy Mode (2010)Crossroad Message & Tales From the Bone - Reissue (2010)

With King HoboKing Hobo (2008)
 Mauga (2019)

With Death Organ9 to 5 (1995)Universal Stripsearch (1997)

With Boom ClubBuy One or Be One (1994)

Guest appearances
 Anekdoten - Vemod (1993)
 Anekdoten - Chapters (2009)
 Anekdoten - Until All the Ghosts Are Gone (2015)
 Arch Enemy - Burning Bridges (1999)
 Arch Enemy - Wages of Sin (2001)
 Arch Enemy - Anthems of Rebellion (2003)
 Arch Enemy - Rise of the Tyrant (2007) (uncredited on the album)
 Arch Enemy - Khaos Legions (2011)
 Arch Enemy - War Eternal (2014)
 Arch Enemy - Covered in Blood (2019)
 Apollo - Waterdevils (2016)
 Automatism - Sonar Split EP with Pavallion (2019)
 Automatism - Immersion (2020)
 Bacon - Like It Black (2010)
 Bacon Brothers - Pit Stop (2000)
 The Bakerton Group - El Rojo (2009)
 Beat Under Control - The Introduction (2004)
 Big Scenic Nowhere - Dying on the Mountain (2019)
 Big Scenic Nowhere - Vision Beyond Horizon (2020)
 Big Scenic Nowhere - Lavender Blues (2020)
 Big Scenic Nowhere - The Long Morrow (2022)
 cKy - Lost in Departures (2021)
 Conny Bloom - Been There, Done What Live! (2003)
 Candlemass - Psalms for the Dead (2012)
 Candlemass - (Candlemass vs Entombed, Limited edition CD, recorded for Sweden Rock Magazine's 100th issue)(2013)
 Carcass - Despicable (2020)
 Carcass - Torn Arteries (2021)
 Dool - Summerland (2020)
 Dotty Blue - Perfect Free Choice (2009)
 Dun Ringill - Welcome (2019)
 Dun Ringill - Library of Death (2020)
 Enslaved - Roadburn Live (2017)
 Fear Falls Burning - Function Collapse Live (2021)
 General Surgery - Split w/ Bodybag (2017)
 Greenleaf -  Nest of Vipers (2012)
 Grand Magus -  Sword Songs (2016)
 Hexandagger - Nine of Swords 7-inch (2016)
 Sivert Høyem - Endless Love (2014)
 Ulf Ivarsson/Bill Laswell - Nammu (2022)
 Kamchatka - Volume III (2009)
 Kamchatka - Bury Your Roots (2011)
 Little Chris - At Last (2002)
 Mirror Queen - Starliner/Career Of Evil (2016)
 Mount Mary - Mount Mary (2021)
 The Mushroom River Band - Music for the World Beyond (2000)
 Nate Bergman - Metaphysical Change (2022)
 Oaf -  "Birth School Oaf Death" (2013)
 Renaissance of Fools - Fear, Hope & Frustration (2011)
 Roadhouse Diet - Won't Bend or Break (2018)
 Roadhouse Diet - Electric Devilry (2019)
 Sista Maj  - Localized Pockets of Negative Entropy  (2018)
 Sista Maj - The Extreme Limit  (2019)
 Sky High - Highlights 1978-1998 (1998)
 Sky High - Bluester (1999)
 Sky High - On the Cover: 25 Years of Madness (2002)
 Sky High - Soul Survivor (2004)
 Sky High - Have Guitar Will Travel - Reissue ( 2005)
 Sky High - Safe Sex Live - Reissue ( 2005)
 Sky High - 28 Years of Madness DVD (2006)
 Sky High - Stone & Gravel (2015)
 Sky High - 20 Från Fyrtio (2020)
 Thoughts & Prayers - Alive In The Night Of The Wicked - PA version (2022)
 Vokonis - Odyssey (2021)
 Vokonis - Null & Void (2021)
 Watertouch - We Never Went to the Moon'' (2004)

References

External links

Opeth members
Living people
Heavy metal keyboardists
Swedish heavy metal keyboardists
1968 births
Musicians from Stockholm
Death metal musicians
Progressive rock musicians
Spiritual Beggars members